George Bryan Polivka (born July 26, 1957) is an American writer, producer, and author. He is best known for his faith-based fantasy books, notably The Trophy Chase trilogy and its prequel Blaggard’s Moon.
In 1986, Polivka won an Emmy Award for writing the sports documentary, "A Hard Road to Glory," with Arthur Ashe. Polivka was a 2009 Christy Award "Visionary" finalist. Polivka lives near Baltimore, Maryland, with his wife and children.

Documentaries  
 A Hard Road to Glory

Novels 
 The Legend of the Firefish
 The Hand that Bears the Sword
 The Battle for Vast Dominion
 Blaggard’s Moon

Awards 
 1986 Emmy Award for writing, A Hard Road to Glory

References 

 FictionDB  http://www.fictiondb.com/author/george-bryan-polivka~41957.htm
 Emmy Awards  http://www.emmyonline.tv/files/Bryan_Polivka.pdf
 Christy Awards  https://web.archive.org/web/20120124031909/http://www.christyawards.com/ca_new/images/stories/client_pdf/00-10_WinnersFinalists.pdf 
 Publishers Weekly  http://www.publishersweekly.com/978-0-7369-1956-2  
 Publisher's Marketplace  https://web.archive.org/web/20150903194727/http://www.publishersmarketplace.com/members/Bookman/ 
 WorldNews Network  http://article.wn.com/view/2011/03/08/Trophy_Chase_Trilogy_by_George_Bryan_Polivka/
 News Release Today  http://www.newreleasetoday.com/bookdetail.php?book_id=2126

Emmy Award winners
1957 births
Living people